The Geelong Cup is held annually at The Beckley Centre and is organised by the Geelong Greyhound Racing Club. It is the highlight of greyhound racing year in Geelong and is one of Greyhound Racing Victoria's Country Cups, and is run over 460 metres. The cup is worth $47,000 to the winner. The Cup was first held in 1962.

Past winners

Distances

 1962-2009 (457 metres)
 2010-2019 (460 metres)
 2020-present (520 metres)

References 

Greyhound racing competitions in Australia